The 1937 UCI Road World Championships took place in Copenhagen, Denmark. Only eight riders finished the professional road race.

Events Summary

Medals table

References

 
UCI Road World Championships by year
W
R
International cycle races hosted by Denmark